James Myles O'Gorman, O.C.S.O. (October 4, 1804 – July 4, 1874) was an Irish-born bishop of the Catholic Church in the United States. He served as the Vicar Apostolic of the Nebraska Territory (now known as the Archdiocese of Omaha) from 1859 to 1874.

Biography
Born in the village of Cranna in County Tipperary, Ireland, O'Gorman professed solemn vows as a Trappist at Mount Melleray Abbey on March 25, 1841, and was ordained a priest on December 23, 1843.  He emigrated to the United States and became a monk at New Melleray Monastery near Dubuque, Iowa where he became its second Prior.  On January 28, 1859 Pope Pius IX appointed him as the Titular Bishop of Raphanea and Bishop of Omaha.  He was consecrated a bishop by Archbishop Peter Richard Kenrick of St. Louis on May 8, 1859. The principal co-consecrators were Bishops John Baptiste Miège, S.J., the Vicar Apostolic of Kansas, and Henry Juncker of Alton.  When the Vicariate was established in 1859 it covered  and emcopassed what are now the states of Nebraska, Wyoming, Montana, North Dakota, South Dakota, as well as northeastern Colorado,  and parts of Utah.  When O'Gorman arrived he had three priests to assist him and ordained another priest that year.  By the time he died there were 19 priests that served 12,000 Catholics in 20 parishes and 56 missions.  O'Gorman participated in the First Vatican Council (1869-1870) as one of the council fathers.  He died on July 4, 1874, at the age of 69.

References

1804 births
1874 deaths
19th-century American Roman Catholic titular bishops
19th-century Irish Roman Catholic priests
Irish emigrants to the United States (before 1923)
Participants in the First Vatican Council
People from County Tipperary
Religious leaders from Nebraska
Roman Catholic Archdiocese of Omaha
Trappists